The British Columbia Provincial Soccer Championship is a soccer tournament organized by the British Columbia Soccer Association. The tournament winner advances to the national Challenge Trophy tournament for men and Jubilee Trophy tournament for women, organized by the Canadian Soccer Association. It has a history of 122 years and the men's 'A' championship competes for the 90-year-old Province Cup trophy. Teams qualify by final league standings or by winning their league cup. The number of berths and team seeding each league is awarded in each year's competition is determined annually by the Adult Competitions Committee. The cup competition brackets are created by a publicly accessible or open random draw out of a "hat". The format is a single elimination style tournament. 
The leagues taking part in the Provincial Cup in 2013 are:

Women's
 Metro Women's Soccer League 
 Lower Island Women's Soccer Association 
 Pacific Coast Soccer League

Men's
 Vancouver Metro Soccer League
 Fraser Valley Soccer League
 Vancouver Island Soccer League
 Pacific Coast Soccer League
 Burnaby Men's Soccer League

Champions

British Columbia Cup
 1892 Nanaimo Rangers
 1893 Nanaimo Ranger
 1894 Victoria Wanderers
 1895 Nanaimo Rangers
 1896 Victoria Wanderers
 1897 Victoria Wanderers
 1898 Wellington Rovers
 1899 Wellington Rovers
 1900 Victoria AFC
 1901 Victoria AFC
 1902 Victoria AFC
 1903 Nanaimo
 1904 Garrison
 1905 Garrison
 1906 Garrison
 1907 Ladysmith
 1908 Nanaimo United
 1909 Ladysmith
McBride Shield
 1911 Victoria West FC
 1912 Coquitlam Ranchers
 1913 no winner declared
 1914 no winner declared
 1915 Coquitlam Rangers
 1916 Vancouver St. Andrews FC
 1917 no winner declared
 1918 no winner declared
 1919 Wallace Shipyard
 1920 Cumberland United
 1921 Cumberland
Province Cup
 1922 Vancouver St. Andrews FC
 1923 Ladysmith FC
 1924 Ladysmith FC
 1925 Cumberland FC
 1926 Nanaimo City FC
 1927 Nanaimo FC Wanderers
 1928 Ladysmith FC
 1929 Westminster Royals FC
 1930 Westminster Royals FC
 1931 Westminster Royals FC
 1932 Nanaimo City FC
 1933 North Shore United FC
 1934 Nanaimo City FC
 1935 Vancouver St. Saviours

 1936 Westminster Royals FC
 1937 North Shore United FC
 1938 North Shore United FC
 1939 Vancouver St. Saviours
 1940 Vancouver Radials FC
 1941 North Shore United FC
 1942 Vancouver Boeing FC
 1943 Vancouver Pro-Rec FC
 1944 North Shore United FC
 1945 North Shore United FC
 1946 North Shore United FC
 1947 Vancouver St. Andrews FC
 1948 North Shore United FC
 1949 North Shore United FC
 1950 Vancouver St. Andrews FC
 1951 Vancouver St. Andrews FC
 1952 Vancouver City FC
 1953 Vancouver City FC
 1954 Vancouver Firefighters FC
 1955 Vancouver Firefighters FC
 1956 Vancouver Hale-Co
 1957 Vancouver Firefighters FC
 1958 Vancouver Capilano FC
 1959 Vancouver Capilano FC
 1960 North Shore Carling's
 1961 Vancouver Firefighters FC
 1962 Vancouver Firefighters FC
 1963 Vancouver Firefighters FC
 1964 Vancouver Columbus FC
 1965 Vancouver Firefighters FC
 1966 North Shore Luckies FC
 1967 Vancouver Firefighters FC
 1968 Vancouver Columbus FC
 1969 Vancouver Columbus FC
 1970 Croatia SC Vancouver
 1971 Vancouver Eintracht
 1972 Westminster Blues SC
 1973 Vancouver Firefighters FC
 1974 Vancouver Lobban's FC
 1975 Victoria London Boxing Club
 1976 Victoria West FC
 1977 Vancouver Italia Cdn. Columbus

 1978 Vancouver Columbus FC
 1979 Victoria West FC
 1980 Victoria West FC
 1981 Victoria West FC
 1982 Victoria West FC
 1983 Vancouver Firefighters FC
 1984 Victoria West FC
 1985 Croatia SC Vancouver
 1986 Croatia SC Vancouver
 1987 New Westminster QPR
 1988 Norvan ANAF #45
 1989 Westside Primo SC
 1990 Vancouver Firefighters FC
 1991 Norvan ANAF #45
 1992 Norvan ANAF #45
 1993 Westside Rino
 1994 Coquitlam SC Metro Ford
 1995 North Shore Pegasus
 1996 Vancouver Westside CIBC
 1997 North Shore Pegasus
 1998 Vancouver Firefighters FC
 1999 Coquitlam Metro-Ford SC
 2000 Vancouver Westside Rino's
 2001 Victoria Gorge FC
 2002 Victoria Gorge FC
 2003 Surrey United SC
 2004 Surrey Pegasus FC
 2005 Vancouver Portuguese SC
 2006 Sapperton Rovers
 2007 Vancouver Columbus Clan FC
 2008 Victoria Gorge FC
 2009 West Van FC
 2010 Victoria Gorge FC
 2011 Surrey ICST Pegasus
 2012 Surrey United Firefighters
 2013 Surrey United Firefighters
 2014 Croatia SC Vancouver
 2015 EDC FC Burnaby
 2016 Surrey Pegasus FC
 2017 Vancouver Club Inter FC
 2018 Surrey BC Tigers Hurricanes
 2019 Surrey Central City Breakers FC
 2022 Surrey BB5 United

Mainland Cup Winners

 1914 Coquitlam
 1915 Coquitlam Ranchers
 1916 Vancouver St. Andrews FC
 1917 231st Battalion
 1918 Vancouver Coughlans
 1919 Wallace Shipyards
 1920 Wallace Shipyards
 1921 Vancouver St. Andrews FC
 1922 Vancouver St. Andrews FC
 1923 University of British Columbia
 1924 Vancouver St. Andrews FC
 1925 Vancouver St. Andrews FC
 1926 South Hill
 1927 Empire Stevedores

 1928 Westminster Royals FC
 1929 Westminster Royals FC
 1930 Vancouver St. Andrews FC
 1931 North Shore United FC
 1932 Vancouver Sons of Scotland
 1933 Vancouver Chinese Students
 1934 Nanaimo FC
 1935 Nanaimo FC
 1936 North Shore United FC
 1937 Vancouver Johnston National
 1938 Vancouver St. Andrews FC
 1939 Vancouver St. Saviours FC
 1940 North Shore United FC

 1941 North Shore United FC
 1942 Vancouver St. Andrews FC
 1943 Vancouver St. Saviours FC
 1944 North Shore United FC
 1945 Vancouver St. Saviours FC
 1946 North Shore United FC
 1947 Vancouver St. Andrews FC
 1948 Vancouver City FC
 1949 North Shore United FC
 1951 Vancouver St. Andrews FC
 1953 Westminster Royals
 1954 Vancouver City FC
 1955 Vancouver Firefighters FC

Challenge Cup British Columbia Section Winners

 1947 Vancouver St. Andrews FC
 1948 Vancouver St. Andrews FC
 1949 North Shore United FC
 1950 Vancouver City FC
 1951 Vancouver St. Andrews FC

 1952 Westminster Royals FC
 1953 Westminster Royals FC
 1954 North Shore United FC
 1955 Westminster Royals FC
 1956 Vancouver Hale-Co FC

 1957 North Shore United FC
 1958 Westminster Royals FC
 1959 Westminster Royals FC
 1960 Westminster Royals FC

Women's Province Cup champions

 1982 Burnaby Edmonds
 1983 Richmond Olympic Superstars
 1984 James Bay SC
 1985 Richmond Kornerkicks
 1986 Richmond Kornerkicks
 1987 Coquitlam SC
 1988 Coquitlam SC
 1989 Surrey Strikers
 1990 Coquitlam SC Strikers
 1991 Surrey Marlins SC
 1992 Surrey Marlins SC
 1993 Surrey Marlins SC
 1994 Coquitlam Strikers

 1995 Victoria Gorge FC
 1996 Vancouver UBC Alumni
 1997 Vancouver UBC Alumni
 1998 Vancouver UBC Alumni
 1999 Vancouver UBC Alumni
 2000 Vancouver UBC Alumni
 2001 Burnaby Canadians FC
 2002 Burnaby Canadians FC
 2003 Vancouver UBC Alumni
 2004 Surrey United SC
 2005 Surrey United SC
 2006 Surrey United SC
 2007 Surrey United SC

 2008 Surrey United SC
 2009 Surrey United SC
 2010 Surrey United SC
 2011 Surrey United SC
 2012 Surrey United SC
 2013 Surrey United SC
 2014 Surrey United SC
 2015 North Shore Girls SC
 2016 Richmond FC
 2017 Surrey United SC
 2018 Surrey United SC
 2019 Coquitlam Metro-Ford SC

Sources:

See also
Challenge Trophy
Soccer in Canada

Notes

References

 Canada Soccer Records & Results

Soccer in British Columbia
Canadian National Challenge Cup
Soccer cup competitions in Canada